The École militaire de l'air (Air Force Military School) was a military school training officers of the French Air Force. It was the equivalent of the École militaire interarmes for the Army or the École militaire de la flotte for the French Navy. It ran from 1925 to 2015, when it joined the École de l'air.

References

Aviation schools
Aviation schools in France
Air force academies
Grandes écoles
Military academies of France
Educational institutions established in 1925
1925 establishments in France